This article details the fixtures and results of the Bahrain national football team in 2009.

Results

References 

Bahrain national football team
2009 national football team results
2009–10 in Bahraini football
2008–09 in Bahraini football